Mangelia larga is an extinct species of sea snail, a marine gastropod mollusc in the family Mangeliidae.

Description

Distribution
This extinct marine species was found in Miocene strata in Ukraine, age range: 13.65 to 11.608 Ma

References

 D. Scarpioni, G. Dellabella, B. Dell’Angelo, J.W. Huntley, and M. Sosso. 2016. Middle Miocene conoidean gastropods from western Ukraine (Paratethys): Integrative taxonomy, palaeo-climatogical and palaeobiogeographical implications. Acta Palaeontologica Polonica 61(2):327-344

External links

larga
Gastropods described in 2016